Thomas Nicoll (born 1 July 1798 at Hendon, Middlesex; died 15 January 1883 at Shenley, Hertfordshire) was an English amateur cricketer who played first-class cricket from 1817 to 1835.  He was mainly associated with Hampshire and with Marylebone Cricket Club (MCC), of which he was a member.  He made 28 known appearances in first-class matches.

References

External links

Bibliography
 Arthur Haygarth, Scores & Biographies, Volumes 1-2 (1744-1840), Lillywhite, 1862

1798 births
1883 deaths
English cricketers
English cricketers of 1787 to 1825
English cricketers of 1826 to 1863
Hampshire cricketers
Marylebone Cricket Club cricketers
Gentlemen cricketers
E. H. Budd's XI cricketers
Non-international England cricketers
A to K v L to Z cricketers
Marylebone Cricket Club Second 10 with 1 Other cricketers
Marylebone Cricket Club First 9 with 3 Others cricketers